San Miguel Piedras Mixtec is a moribund Mixtec language of Oaxaca. It is not close to other varieties of Mixtec.

References 

Mixtec language

Languages of Mexico
Oto-Manguean languages